The Application Packaging Standard (APS) is a standard that defines a technology for integrating application software with hosting platforms. Integration of an application with hosting platforms is implemented by creating an APS package for this application, and APS package deployment creates an APS application.

Participants
APS involves three types of participants into the integration process:
 Independent software vendors (ISVs) use APS to make their applications available to numerous hosting providers and through them to huge number of customers. This is an effective way to convert an application to SaaS. 
 Hosting providers need APS to extend the list of hosted services and integrate them to each other thus making their services much more valuable and attractive for their customers.
 Customers get benefit of consuming APS application services.

Versions
APS went through two stages.

APS 1 emerged as a way for creating predominantly two types of APS packages and respectively two types of APS applications:
 APS site application is installed for each customer who needs the application services. In this case, each customer may have own application instance. APS package carries the site application inside.
 APS external application implies sharing a single cloud application for many customers who can get access to the application services as application tenants. APS package contains the integration components of the application, but not the application itself.

APS 2 added flexibility to integrate applications not only with hosting platforms but also with each other. APS 2 makes it possible to create custom user interface in hosting platforms for managing the integrated applications.

Implementations
The following web hosting platforms allow installations of APS packages:
Plesk
Odin Service Automation
1&1 Internet MyWebsite
ISPsystem ISPmanager
APSpanel
ISPConfig

Application catalog
APS packages are available for download at application catalog.
ISVs can make their applications publicly available by uploading them to this catalog.

See also
Web hosting control panel
Software as a service

References

External links
APS Homepage - Webpage does not exist
APS 1 documentation - Webpage does not exist
Benefits of APS Standard for Developers - Webpage does not exist

Package management systems
Web hosting